The 1979 World Orienteering Championships, the 8th World Orienteering Championships, were held in Tampere, Finland, 2–4 September 1979.

The championships had four events; individual contests for men and women, and relays for men and women.

Medalists

Results

Men's individual

Women's individual

References 

World Orienteering Championships
World Orienteering Championships
International sports competitions hosted by Finland
World Orienteering Championships
Orienteering in Finland
Sports competitions in Tampere